The 1979 Big Eight men's basketball tournament was held February 27–March 3 at a combination of on-campus gymnasiums and Kemper Arena in Kansas City, Missouri.

Top-seeded Oklahoma defeated Kansas in the championship game, 80–65, to capture their first Big Eight men's basketball tournament.

The Sooners, in turn, received a bid to the 1979 NCAA tournament. No other Big 8 members were invited to the tournament.

Format
All eight of the conference's members participated in the tournament field. They were seeded based on regular season conference records, with all teams beginning play in the initial quarterfinal round.

All first round games were played on the home court of the higher-seeded team. The semifinals and championship game, in turn, were played at a neutral site at Kemper Arena in Kansas City, Missouri.

Bracket

References

Tournament
Big Eight Conference men's basketball tournament
Big Eight Conference men's basketball tournament
Big Eight Conference men's basketball tournament
Big Eight Conference men's basketball tournament